Treetops is the former estate of torch singer and actress Libby Holman. It forms the southernmost part of Mianus River Park and is overseen by the Connecticut Department of Energy and Environmental Protection as the Mianus River State Park.

In 2001, a successful effort was made by local citizens to save the estate from development. As a result, 94 acres of pristine grounds were preserved as a state park, with a further 11 acres around the Treetops mansion covered by a conservation easement. Many rooms in Holman's mansion have been restored by its current owners. These include the studio of Holman's third husband, abstract artist Louis Schanker, where the Treetops Chamber Music Society performed its annual concert series in 2006.

Mianus River State Park
Mianus River State Park, which straddles the border of Stamford and Greenwich, encompasses 391 acres and comprises Treetops (94 acres), Mianus River Park (187 acres owned by the City of Stamford), and the Mianus River and Natural Park (110 acres owned by the Town of Greenwich). Nearby  Mianus River parks include the Mianus River State Park Scenic Reserve (over 353 acres in two tracts) and the privately owned Mianus River Gorge Preserve (935 acres, open to the public from April 1 through November 30).

Access
Entrance parking for Treetops is at Merribrook Lane in Stamford.

Entrance parking for the adjacent Mianus River State Park is also at Merribrook Lane in Stamford.

Entrance parking for the Mianus River State Park Scenic Reserve is at Farms Road.

Entrance parking for the Mianus River and Natural Park is at Cognewaugh Road in Greenwich.

Entrance parking for the Mianus River Gorge Preserve is at 167 Mianus River Road in Bedford.

References

External links
Friends of Mianus River Park
Mianus River Gorge, Inc.
Mianus River Park Trail Map Friends of Mianus River Park trail map
Mianus River State Park Connecticut Department of Energy and Environmental Protection

State parks of Connecticut
Parks in Fairfield County, Connecticut
Geography of Stamford, Connecticut
Greenwich, Connecticut
Protected areas established in 2001
2001 establishments in Connecticut